Horhausen is the name of several municipalities in Rhineland-Palatinate:

 Horhausen, Altenkirchen
 Horhausen, Rhein-Lahn